Rocking the boat may be:

 Abilene paradox
 Rocking the Boat, a non-profit organization